Mike Margulis (August 30, 1950 – September 15, 2018) was an American soccer player who was a member of the U.S. soccer team at the 1972 Summer Olympics. He was born in St. Louis, Missouri. He played one game for the U.S. soccer team at the 1972 Summer Olympics.  Some references state that he attended St. Louis University, but he is not listed in the school's soccer records. Margulis was called into the Olympic team for the 1972 Summer Olympics.  He played the third, and final, U.S. game of the tournament, a 7–0 loss to West Germany.

References

External links
 

1950 births
2018 deaths
American soccer players
Olympic soccer players of the United States
Footballers at the 1972 Summer Olympics
Soccer players from St. Louis
Association football forwards